John Alexander McCullough (17 January 1860 – 29 July 1947) was a New Zealand tinsmith, trade unionist and political activist.

Biography
He was born in Belfast, County Antrim, Ireland on 17 January 1860.

He was elected a member of the Christchurch City Council from 1912 to 1917.

The First Labour Government appointed McCullough to the New Zealand Legislative Council on 9 March 1936. At the end of his seven-year term, he was reappointed on 9 March 1943. He remained a member until his death on 29 July 1947.

He died in Christchurch on 29 July 1947 aged 87.

See also
The 1908 Blackball miners' strike

References

1860 births
1947 deaths
Members of the New Zealand Legislative Council
New Zealand Labour Party MLCs
New Zealand trade unionists
Northern Ireland emigrants to New Zealand
Irish emigrants to New Zealand (before 1923)
People from County Antrim
Social Democratic Party (New Zealand) politicians
Christchurch City Councillors